The Argentina women's national beach handball team is the national team of Argentina. It is governed by the Confederacion Argentina de Handball and takes part in international beach handball competitions.

Results

World Championship
2014 – 11th place
2016 – 7th place
2022 – 7th place

World Games
2017 - 
2022 -

World Beach Games

Other Competitions
2019 South American Beach Games – 
2019 South and Central American Beach Handball Championship - 
2022 South and Central American Beach Handball Championship -

Youth team results
2018 Summer Youth Olympics - 
2017 Youth Beach Handball World Championship - 
2022 Youth Beach Handball World Championship - 5th
2017 Pan American Youth Beach Handball Championship - 
2022 South and Central American Youth Beach Handball Championship - 
2022 South American Youth Games -

References

External links
Official website
IHF profile

Beach handball
Women's national beach handball teams
Beach handball